Coyote Valley may refer to:
 Coyote Valley, California
 Coyote Valley, Colorado (Kawuneeche Valley)